Kiliantoppen is a mountain in Haakon VII Land at Spitsbergen, Svalbard. The mountain has a height of 1284 m.a.s.l. and is located east of the bay of Möllerfjorden, between the glaciers of Presidentbreen and Mayerbreen. It is named after French geologist Charles Wilfrid Kilian.

References

Mountains of Spitsbergen